A Kaddish for Bernie Madoff: The Film is a 2021 musical documentary film starring Alicia J. Rabins & directed by Alicia J. Rose based on the 2012 one-woman show created & written by Rabins.

Synopsis 
The film tells the story of fraudulent investor Bernie Madoff and the system that allowed him to pull off his pyramid scheme for decades – through interviews, ancient spiritual texts, and the unique perspective of an obsessed artist watching the events unfold from her residency in an abandoned office building in Manhattan's financial district.

Cast 

 Alicia Jo Rabins
 Robin McAlpine
 Judy Silk
 Lois Feuerle 
 David Frank

Production 
A Kaddish for Bernie Madoff premiered at the 44th Portland International Film Festival. North American rights to the film were acquired by Freestyle Digital Media in August 2022.

Recepetion

Critical reception 
A Kaddish for Bernie Madoff was met with positive reviews from publications such as The Atlantic and The Forward. Kristi Turnquist of The Oregonian describes the film as "an original -- lyrical, emotional and thoughtful". A Kaddish for Bernie Madoff won the Terry Porter Visionary Award at the Sarasota Film Festival.

Elisabeth Vincentelli of The New York Times gave the film a less than positive review. She described A Kaddish for Bernie Madoff as a "hybrid of documentary, memoir and musical-mystical essay" and stated that it felt "shaggily shapeless, as if Rabins and Rose were unsure what, exactly, they were trying to say".

References

External links 
 
 
 Official website

2021 documentary films
American documentary films
American docudrama films
2021 films
2020s English-language films
2020s American films